The Old Grandin Library is a historic building located at 12 East Main Street in Clinton, Hunterdon County, New Jersey. It was added to the National Register of Historic Places on November 1, 1974 for its significance in architecture and education. It was built in 1898 as a public library for the town with funds from the estate of Daniel F. Grandin.

See also
 National Register of Historic Places listings in Hunterdon County, New Jersey

References

External links
 

Buildings and structures in Clinton, New Jersey	
National Register of Historic Places in Hunterdon County, New Jersey
1898 establishments in New Jersey
Libraries on the National Register of Historic Places in New Jersey
Historic district contributing properties in New Jersey